The London and North Eastern Railway (LNER) Class O4 initially consisted of the 131 ex-Great Central Railway (GCR) Class 8K 2-8-0 steam locomotives acquired on grouping in 1923. The engines were designed by John G. Robinson and built at the GCR's Gorton Locomotive Works, Manchester.

O4 History post 1923

The O4s were added to when the LNER purchased 273 ex-Railway Operating Division ROD 2-8-0s to the same design between 1923 and 1927. Meanwhile, the 19 GCR Class 8M (LNER Class O5) were rebuilt as O4 standard during the 1920s and 1930s.  92 O4 locomotives were requisitioned by the War Department during World War II and shipped during late 1941 for operation in the Middle East.

The O4 class were used to haul heavy freight trains throughout the LNER system. 329 engines remained in operation at 1 January 1948.

Sub-classes
The LNER rebuilt many, allotting them into eight subclasses.
Sub-class details:
 O4/1, Introduced 1911. Robinson GCR design with small boiler, Belpaire firebox, steam and vacuum brakes and water scoop.
 O4/2, Introduced 1925. O4/3 with cabs and boiler mountings reduced.
 O4/3, Introduced 1917. ROD locos with steam brake only and no water scoop.
 O4/4, Rebuilt with O2 boiler, extended rear frames and side window cab, since rebuilt again.
 O4/5, Rebuilt with shortened O2-type boiler (Diagram 15A). Retained GCR style cab
 O4/6, Introduced 1924. Rebuilt from O5 retaining higher cab. 63914-20 with side windows. All cabs eventually reduced in height.
 O4/7, Introduced 1939. Rebuilt with shortened O2-type boiler (Diagram 15D), retaining GCR smokebox.
 O4/8, Introduced 1944. Rebuilt with B1 boiler (Diagram 100A) and B1 style side window cab.

In 1944, 58 O4s were rebuilt with 100A boiler, Walschaerts valve gear and new cylinders at Gorton Works, then classified O1.

British Railways

The surviving 329 Class O4 locomotives passed to British Railways (BR) on 1 January 1948. They were then widely operated on freight trains throughout the Eastern and North Eastern regions of BR. The locomotives were given BR numbers in the range 63570-63920 but this range included 58 locomotives which had been rebuilt as Class O1. Withdrawal of O4 engines by BR commenced in 1959 and the last was taken out of service in the Doncaster area in April 1966.

Preservation 

An O4/1, GCR No. 102, BR No. 63601, is part of the extensive National Collection, and is preserved on the preserved Great Central Railway at Loughborough, Leicestershire. A further three Robinson 2-8-0s were exported and survive in preservation in New South Wales, Australia.

References

Gallery

External links 

 LNER encyclopedia

2-8-0 locomotives
O4
1′D h2 locomotives
Railway Operating Division locomotives
Freight locomotives